Matthew Thomas Kendrick (born January 15, 1990) is an American professional basketball player for the Toyoda Gosei Scorpions in Japan.

References

1990 births
Living people
Saint Leo Lions men's basketball players
Toyoda Gosei Scorpions players
American men's basketball players
Centers (basketball)
Power forwards (basketball)